The Tasmanian blenny (Parablennius tasmanianus) is a species of combtooth blenny found in the eastern Indian Ocean (Australia) to Southwest Pacific (New Zealand).  This species reaches a length of  TL. It is a herbivore which feeds mainly on algae and is common around man-made structures, such as jetties, and in tidal pools.

References

External links
 Fishes of Australia : Parablennius tasmanianus

Tasmanian blenny
Marine fish of Tasmania
Marine fish of Southern Australia
Marine fish of New Zealand
tasmanian blenny